Utracán is a department of the province of La Pampa (Argentina).

Its governing body is called Comisión de Fomento.

Municipalities and villages 

The department of Utracán comprises three municipalities and three villages.

Municipalities 

 General Acha
 Ataliva Roca
 Quehué

Villages 

 Chacharramendi
 Colonia Santa María
 Unanue

References

External links

Departments of La Pampa Province